Admiral Foote may refer to:

Andrew Hull Foote (1806–1863), U.S. Navy rear admiral
Edward Foote (1767–1833), British Royal Navy vice admiral
Percy Wright Foote (1879–1961), U.S. Navy rear admiral